Mangelia munda is a species of sea snail, a marine gastropod mollusk in the family Mangeliidae.

This species is not to be confused with Mangilia munda Suter, 1909 (synonym of Antiguraleus mundus (Suter, 1909))

Description
The length of the shell attains 4.5 mm, its diameter 1⅔ mm.

The white shell has a narrow-ovate shape. It contains 7 whorls  of which 2 smooth and convex whorls in the protoconch.
This species is especially remarkable for the fine yet very prominent thread-like lirations encircling the whorls. The longitudinal ribs are stout, rounded, and equalling in width the interstices between them. The aperture is narrow and measures about ⅓ of the total length of the shell. The outer lip is incrassate. The truncated siphonal canal is very short.

Distribution
The marine species occurs in the Persian Gulf and in the China Sea.

References

External links
  Tucker, J.K. 2004 Catalog of recent and fossil turrids (Mollusca: Gastropoda). Zootaxa 682:1-1295.

munda
Gastropods described in 1888